The following is a discography of production by Diplo, an American DJ and record producer. It includes a list of songs produced, co-produced and remixed by year, artist, album and title.

Singles produced

2002

Diplo – Sound and Fury 
 01. "Form"
 02. "One-Four"
 03. "Making it Hard"
 04. "Krunk (Variation #2)"
 05. "When Eggnog Goes Bad"
 06. "Total Blank"
 07. "Support Your Local Travel Agent"
 08. "Slow Fall"
 09. "Krunkepistomology"
 10. "Lost Under My Sheets"
 11. "Dana"
 12. "Pinniped-Quadruped"
 13. "Clear Day (Reprise) Dinosaurs Can See Everything"
 14. "Uppity"
 15. "Light in August"
 16. "Bonus Beats"

2004

Diplo – Florida 
 01. "Florida"
 02. "Big Lost"
 03. "Sarah"
 04. "Into the Sun" (featuring. Martina Topley-Bird)
 05. "Way More"
 Sample Credit: "Aria" by Marc Moulin
 06. "Money, Power, Respect"
 07. "Diplo Rhythm" (featuring. Sandra Melody, Vybz Cartel & Pantera Os Danadinhos)
 08. "Works"
 09. "Indian Thick Jawns" (featuring. P.E.A.C.E.)
 10. "Summer's Gonna Hurt You"
 Sample Credit: "Múm" by The Balled of the Broken Birdie Records
 11. "It's all Part of a Bigger Plan"

Viktor Vaughn - VV:2 
 02. "Back End" (Produced with System D-128)

2005

Kano – Home Sweet Home 
 04. Reload It"

M.I.A. – Arular 
 03. "Bucky Done Gun" (Produced with Switch)
 Sample Credit: "Gonna Fly Now" by Bill Conti
 Sample Credit: "Injeção" by Deise Tigrona

2007

M.I.A. – Kala 
 05. "Hussel" (featuring. Afrikan Boy) (Produced with M.I.A.)
 10. "XR2" (Produced with Switch)
 11. "Paper Planes" (Produced with Switch)

2008

Santigold – Santogold 
 06. "My Superman" (Produced with John Hill)
 08. "Starstruck" (Produced with Switch & John Hill)
 09. "Unstoppable" (Produced with John Hill)

2009

Drake – So Far Gone 
 11. "Unstoppable" (featuring. Lil Wayne & Santigold) (Produced with John Hill)
  Sample Credit: "Unstoppable" by Santigold

Amanda Blank – I Love You 
 02. "Something Bigger, Something Better"
 05. "Lemme Get Some" (featuring. Chuck Inglish)
 07. "A Love Song" (featuring. Santigold)
 08. "DJ" (Additional production by Switch)

Die Antwoord – $O$ 
 05. "Evil Boy" (featuring. Wanga)
 Appearance in video

2010

Snoop Dogg – More Malice 
 05. "That Tree" (featuring. Kid Cudi) (Additional production by Paul Devro)

Rolo Tomassi – Cosmology 
 01. "Katzenklavier"
 02. "Agamemnon"
 03. "House House Casanova"
 04. "Party Wounds"
 05. "Unromance"
 06. "French Motel"
 07. "Kasia"
 08. "Sakia"
 09. "Tongue In Chic"
 10. "Cosmology"

Robyn – Body Talk Pt. 1 
 05. "Dancehall Queen" (Produced with Klas Åhlund)

M.I.A. – Maya 
 07. "It Takes a Muscle"
 11. "Tell Me Why"
 Sample Credit: "The Last Words of Copernicus" by Alabama Sacred Harp Singers

Robyn – Body Talk Pt. 2 
 06. "Criminal Intent" (Produced with Klas Åhlund)

Das Racist – Sit Down, Man 
 17. "You Can Sell Anything"

Robyn – Body Talk 
 12. "Dancehall Queen" (Produced with Klas Åhlund)

G-Dragon & T.O.P. – GD & TOP 
 06. "뻑이가요 (Knock Out)"

2011

Chris Brown – F.A.M.E. 
 04. "Look at Me Now" (featuring. Lil Wayne & Busta Rhymes) (Produced with Afrojack & Free School)

Beyoncé – 4 
 10. "End of Time" (Produced with Beyoncé, The-Dream & Switch)

Alex Clare – The Lateness of the Hour 
 04. "Too Close" (Produced with Switch & Mike Spencer)

Kelly Rowland – Here I Am 
 15. "Motivation (Diplo Remix)" (Produced with Jim Jonsin & Rico Love) (International edition)

Nicola Roberts –  Cinderella's Eyes 
 01. "Beat of My Drum" (Produced with Dimitri Tikovoi & Derek Allen)

Lil Wayne – Tha Carter IV 
 18. "Two Shots" (Additional Production by DJA) (Deluxe edition bonus track)

Das Racist – Relax 
 07. "Happy Rappy"

Wale – Ambition 
 10. "Slight Work" (featuring. Big Sean)

Yelawolf – Radioactive 
 09. "Animal" (featuring. Fefe Dobson) (Produced with Borgore)

The Death Set – Michel Poiccard 
 15. "Yo David Chase! You P.O.V. Shot Me In The Head"

2012

Santigold – Master of My Make-Believe 
 08. "Pirate In the Water" (Produced with Santigold & Switch)
 10. "Look at these Hoes" (Produced with Santigold & Boyz Noize)

Marina and the Diamonds – Electra Heart 
 03. "Lies" (Produced with Dr. Luke & Cirkut)

Travis Porter – From Day 1 
 04. "Wobble" (Produced with DJA)

Usher – Looking 4 Myself 
 03. "Climax"
 17. "2nd Round" (Deluxe edition bonus track)

Justin Bieber – Believe 
 09. "Thought of You" (Produced with Ariel Rechtshaid)

Azealia Banks – Fantasea 
 05. "Fuck Up The Fun" (Produced with DJ Master D)

Rita Ora – Ora 
 11. "Hello, Hi, Goodbye" (Produced with The-Dream)
 13. "Crazy Girl" (Deluxe edition bonus track)

Kreayshawn – Somethin' 'Bout Kreay 
 09. "Twerkin!!!" (featuring. Diplo & Sissy Nobby) (Produced with Tai, Free School, Jonas Jeberg)

Iggy Azalea – TrapGold 
(Executive producer)
 02. "Yo El' Ray" (Produced with Bro Safari & FKi)
 03. "Down South" (Produced with FKi)
 04. "Demons" (Produced with Sleigh Bells)
 05. "Slo." (Produced with FKi)
 08. "1 800 BONE" (Produced with FKi)

Bruno Mars – Unorthodox Jukebox 
 09. "Money Make Her Smile" (Produced with The Smeezingtons)

Katy B – Danger EP 
03. "Light As A Feather" (featuring Iggy Azalea)

Wale – Folarin 
15. "The One Eyed Kitten Song" (featuring. Travis Porter)

Marsha Ambrosius – Late Nights & Early Mornings 
00. "Cold War" (Produced with The Picard Bros)

Banda Uó – Motel
 05. "Gringo" (Produced with Davi Sabbag)

2013

Usher – Go Missin' 
 01. "Go Missin'"

Tamar Braxton – Love and War 
 06. "One on One Fun"

PSY – Gangnam Style Remix Style 
 01. "Gangnam Style (Diplo Remix)" (featuring 2 Chainz and Tyga)
 03. "Gangnam Style (Diplo Remix) (Instrumental)"

Lil Wayne – I Am Not a Human Being II 
 15. "Lay It Down" (featuring Nicki Minaj & Cory Gunz) (produced with Hudson Mohawke & Lunice) (Deluxe edition bonus track)

Sevyn Streeter – It Won't Stop 
 00. "It Won't Stop" (Produced with The Picard Bros)

Mac Miller – Watching Movies with the Sound Off 
 17. "Goosebumps"

Tinie Tempah – Demonstration 
 2. "Trampoline" (featuring 2 Chainz)
 9. "Shape" (featuring Big Sean)

G-Dragon – Coup d'Etat
 1. "쿠데타 (Coup d'Etat)" (produced with Baauer)

Britney Spears – Britney Jean
 8. "Passenger"

Justin Bieber – Journals
 15. "Memphis" (featuring. Big Sean)(Produced with Siriusmo & Djemba Djemba)

Snoop Lion – Reincarnated
 1. "Rebel Way" 
 2. "Here Comes the King" (featuring. Angela Hunte)
 3. "Lighters Up" (featuring. Mavado and Popcaan)
 4. "So Long" (featuring. Angela Hunte)
 5. "Get Away" (featuring. Angela Hunte)
 6. "No Guns Allowed" (featuring. Drake and Cori B)
 7. "Fruit Juice" (featuring. Mr. Vegas)
 8. "Smoke the Weed" (featuring. Collie Buddz)
 11. "Torn Apart" (featuring. Rita Ora)
 12. "Ashtrays and Heartbreaks" (featuring. Miley Cyrus)
 13. "Boulevard" (featuring. Jahdan Blakkamoore)
 14. "Remedy" (featuring. Busta Rhymes and Chris Brown)
 15. "La La La"
 16. "Harder Times" (featuring. Jahdan Blakkamoore)

2014

Brooke Candy - Opulence 
 01. "Opulence"

Jessie J – Sweet Talker 
 03. "Sweet Talker"

Chris Brown – X 
 01. "X"

MØ – No Mythologies to Follow
 09. "XXX 88" (featuring Diplo)

2015

Madonna – Rebel Heart
 01. "Living for Love" (produced with Madonna and Ariel Rechtshaid)
 04. "Unapologetic Bitch" (produced with Madonna, Ariel Rechtschaid, Shelco Garcia and Teenwolf)
 06. "Bitch I'm Madonna"  (featuring Nicki Minaj) (produced with Madonna and SOPHIE)
 15. "Best Night" (produced with Madonna)
 16. "Veni Vidi Vici" (featuring Nas) (produced with Madonna)

Ivy Levan – No Good 
 06. "27 Club"

MØ – "Kamikaze – Single" 
 01. "Kamikaze"

2016

Beyoncé – Lemonade 
 02. "Hold Up" 
 11. "All Night"

M.I.A. – AIM 
 13. "Bird Song" (Diplo version)

Craig David - Following My Intuition 
 04. "16"

Black M – Éternel insatisfait 
 06. "Fais-moi rêver"

The Weeknd – Starboy 
 15. "Nothing Without You"

2017

Pabllo Vittar - Vai Passar Mal 
 07. Então Vai

XXXTENTACION - Revenge 
 03. Looking for a Star

Lil Yachty - Teenage Emotions 
 10. Forever Young

Maroon 5 – Red Pill Blues
 06. "Help Me Out" (with Julia Michaels)

2018

Diplo - California EP

Trippie Redd - Life's a Trip

03. Wish by Diplo (feat. Trippie Redd)

2019

Madonna - Madame X 
 04. Future (feat. Quavo)

Trippie Redd - ! (Exclamation Mark)

 01. “!” (feat. Diplo)

Songs remixed 
 2004: Michael Giacchino – "The Glory Days (Diplo Remix)"
 2005: Disco D – "Lets Hug It Out Bitch (Diplo Remix)"
 2005: Edu K – "Popozuda Rock n' Roll (Diplo Remix)"
 2005: Gwen Stefani – "Hollaback Girl (Hollatronix Remix)" (Sample credit:  "Feira de Acari" by Baile Funk)
 2005: Kanye West – "Gold Digger (Diplo Mix)"
 2005: Spank Rock – "Put That Pussy On Me (Diplo Tonite Remix)"
 2005: Three 6 Mafia – "Stay Fly (Mad Decent Remix)"
 2005: Biz Markie – "Vapors (Diplo Remix)"
 2005: Walter Wanderley – "Popcorn (Diplo Remix)"
 2006: Beck – "Wish Coin (Go it Alone)"
 2006: Bloc Party – "Helicopter (Diplo Remix)"
 2006: Clipse – "Queen Bitch (Diplo Remix)"
 2006: CSS – "Let's Make Love and Listen to Death From Above (Diplo Remix)"
 2006: Daedelus – "Sundown (Diplo Remix)"
 2006: Hot Chip – "Over And Over (Shake It Over And Over)"
 2006: Justin Timberlake – "My Love (Diplo Remix)"
 2006: The Beatles – "Twist and Shout (Diplo B'more Edit)"
 2006: Yeah Yeah Yeahs – "Gold Lion (Diplo Remix)"
 2007: M.I.A. – "Birdflu (Diplo Remix)"
 2007: Claude VonStroke – "The Whistler (Diplo Remix)"
 2007: Daft Punk – "Harder, Better, Faster, Stronger (Diplo's Work Is Never Over)"
 2007: Peter Bjorn and John – "Young Folks (Diplo's Drums of Death Remix)"
 2007: Znobia – "Tchilo (Diplo Mix)"
 2007: Bart Simpson – "Do the Bartman (Bartman So So Krispy Remix)"
 2007: The Decemberists – "The Perfect Crime No. 2 (Doing Time Remix)"
 2007: Bloc Party – "Where Is Home? (Diplo Mix)"
 2007: Black Lips – "Veni Vidi Vici (Diplo Remix)"
 2007: Hot Chip – "Shake a Fist (Diplo Remix)"
 2007: Dark Meat – "Unsuccessful Space Jam (Diplo Mix)"
 2008: Sunny Day Sets Fire – "Brainless (Mad Decent Remix)"
 2008: Spoon – "Don't You Evah (Diplo Mix)"
 2008: Kanye West – "Flashing Lights" (Diplo Remix)
 2008: The Black Ghosts – "Repetition Kills You (Diplo Remix)"
 2008: Marlena Shaw – "California Soul (Diplo Remix)"
 2008: Radiohead – "Reckoner" (Diplo Mix)"
 2008: Telepathe – "Chrome's On It (Mad Decent Remix)"
 2008: PRGz – "Bama Gettin Money (Diplo Remix)"
 2008: Journey to the West – "Monkey Bee (Diplo Remix)"
 2009: Private – "My Secret Lover (Diplo Remix)"
 2009: Britney Spears – "Circus (Diplo Circus Remix)"
 2009: Britney Spears – "Circus (Diplo Alt Clown Mix)"
 2009: Bassnectar – "Art of Revolution (Diplo Remix)"
 2009: The Dead Weather – "Treat Me Like Your Mother (Diplo Remix)"
 2009: As Tall As Lions – "Circles (Diplo Remix)"
 2009: Feist – "I Feel It All (Diplo Remix)"
 2009: Brazilian Girls – "Good Time (Diplo Remix)"
 2010: Proxy – 8000 (Diplo Remix)
 2010: Sia – "Clap Your Hands" (Diplo Remix)
 2010: Madonna – Hung Up (Diplo Remix)
 2010: Diplo – Summer's Gonna Hurt You (Diplo 2010 Remix)
 2010: I Blame Coco – Caesar feat. Robyn (Diplo Remix)
 2010: Maroon 5 – Misery (Diplo Put Me Out Of My Misery Mix)
 2010: La Roux – Bulletproof (Diplo and Bot Remix)
 2010: Deerhunter – Helicopter (Diplo and Lunice mix)
 2010: Sunday Girl – Four Floors (Diplo Remix)
 2010: Linkin Park – When They Come For Me (Diplo Remix) For DJ Hero 2
 2010: Robyn – Dancehall Queen feat. Spoek Mathambo (Diplo and Stenchman Remix)
 2011: Sleigh Bells – "Tell 'Em" (Diplo Remix)
 2011: The Streets – "Going Through Hell" (Diplo Remix)
 2011: Travis Barker – "Can a Drummer Get Some? (Diplo Remix)"
 2011: Mavado – "Delilah (Diplo Remix)"
 2011: Ceci Bastida – "Have You Heard? (Diplo Remix)"
 2011: The Wombats – "Techno Fan (Diplo Remix)"
 2011: Tiesto vs. Diplo featuring Busta Ryhmes – C'Mon (Catch 'Em By Surprise)
 2011: The Bloody Beetroots – Church of Noise (Diplo Remix)
 2011: Julianna Barwick – Vow (Diplo and Lunice Remix)
 2011: Star Slinger featuring Reggie B – Dumbin' (Diplo Remix)
 2012: FKi featuring Iggy Azalea & Diplo – "I Think She Ready"
 2012: Usher – "Climax (Diplo Bouncier Climactic Remix)"
 2012: Usher – "Climax (Flosstradamus and Diplo Remix)"
 2012: Katy B – "Witches' Brew (Diplo Remix)"
 2012: Sleigh Bells – "Demons (Diplo Remix)"
 2012: Calvin Harris – Sweet Nothing feat. Florence Welch (Diplo and Grandtheft Remix)
 2012: Psy – Gangnam Style feat. 2 Chainz and Tyga (Diplo Remix)
 2013: Grizzly Bear – Will Calls (Diplo Remix)
 2014: Avicii – You Make Me (Diplo and Ookay Remix)
 2014: Beyoncé – Drunk in Love (Diplo Remix)
 2014: Calvin Harris – Summer (Diplo & Grandtheft Remix)
 2014: Lorde – Tennis Court (Diplo's Andre Agassi Reebok Pump Remix)
 2014: Zola Jesus – "Go, Blank Sea (Diplo Remix)"
 2014: CL – "MTBD (Mental Breakdown) (Diplo Remix)"
 2015: QT – "Hey QT (Diplo Remix)" 
 2015: Rihanna – "Bitch Better Have My Money (Diplo & Grandtheft Remix)" 
 2015: Tiesto & KSHMR feat. Vassy – Secrets (Diplo Remix) 
 2016: MØ - Final Song (Diplo & Jauz remix) 
 2017: Yo Gotti feat. Nicki Minaj - Rake It Up (Diplo & Party Favor (DJ) remix) 
 2019: Lil Nas X & Billy Ray Cyrus - Old Town Road (Diplo remix) 
 2019: Robyn - Missing You (Silk City & Picard Brothers Remix) 
 2019: Carnage - Letting People Go (feat. Prinze George) (Diplo Remix) 
 2019: Kaskade, Felix Cartal, Jenn Blosil - More (Diplo Remix) 
 2019: Tove Lo - Glad He's Gone (Major Lazer Remix) / (Major Lazer Extended Remix) 
 2019: Niall Horan - Nice to Meet Ya (Diplo Remix) 
 2022: Diplo Self Titled Album Don't Forget My Love featuring Miguel High Rise featuring Leon Bridges and Amtrak Your Eyes featuring RYX One by One featuring Elderbrook and Andhim Promises featuring Paul Woolford and Kareen Lomax Right to Left featuring Busta Rhymes and Meje Humble featuring Lil Yachty On My Mind featuring Sidepiece Dont Be Afraid featuring Jungle and Damian Lazarus Let You Go featuring TSHA and Kareen Lomax Forget About Me featuring ALUNA and Durante

References

External links
Diplo at Discogs

Production discography
Discographies of American artists
Electronic music discographies
Hip hop discographies
Production discographies